D. L. Bliss State Park is a state park of California in the United States. It is located on the western shore of Lake Tahoe just north of Emerald Bay State Park.

Notable features include Rubicon Point Light, the highest-elevation lighthouse in the United States. A popular trail in the lakeside forest features a large balancing rock.

The park is named in honor of timber and railroad magnate Duane Leroy Bliss, whose heirs donated  of land to the state in 1929.

See also
List of California state parks

References

1929 establishments in California
Lake Tahoe
Parks in El Dorado County, California
Protected areas established in 1929
Protected areas of the Sierra Nevada (United States)
State parks of California